Scaura is a genus of bees belonging to the family Apidae.

The species of this genus are found in Southern America.

Species:

Scaura amazonica 
Scaura argyrea 
Scaura aspera 
Scaura atlantica 
Scaura cearensis 
Scaura coccidophila 
Scaura latitarsis 
Scaura longula 
Scaura timida

References

Meliponini